Paraguay competed at the 2008 Summer Olympics in Beijing, China.

Athletics

Men

Women

Sailing

Women

M = Medal race; EL = Eliminated – did not advance into the medal race; CAN = Race cancelled;

Shooting 

Women

Swimming 

Men

Women

Table tennis

See also
 Paraguay at the 2007 Pan American Games

References
sports-reference

Nations at the 2008 Summer Olympics
2008
Olympics